Avtar Singh Bhurji (born 15 December 1944) is a former field hockey player. Born in India, he moved to Uganda as an infant. He took up field hockey and competed in the men's tournament at the 1972 Summer Olympics for Uganda.

After the Games, Bhurji continued playing hockey until 1991 until a health condition forced him to retire. He also coached hockey teams for several decades and became a field hockey photographer.

Early life
Bhurji was born in Bika, a village in Jalandhar, India in 1944. The same year he moved to Kampala, the capital city of Uganda, along with his father, who owned a construction company. He attended Demonstration Primary School and Kololo Senior Secondary School in Uganda before spending time In England where he attended Kingston University in London.

Career
As a member of Uganda's burgeoning Asian population, Bhurji took up field hockey. While attending university in England, Bhurji played for Spencer Hockey Club, London Indians and Middlesex Under-21st. He returned to Uganda in 1969, joining Sikh Union Kampala. It was at the club that he was eventually selected for Uganda's squad for the 1972 Summer Olympics in Munich, West Germany by coach Randhir Singh Gentle. The squad contained six players from Bhurji's secondary school.

At the Games, Uganda finished bottom of its group; in its seven matches, the team lost four and drew three, recording a surprise draw with eventual gold medal winners West Germany. Bhurji featured in six of the side's fixtures, missing only the first match with Malaysia.

While Bhurji was at the Olympic Games, Ugandan leader Idi Amin had authorised the seizure of property from Asians living in the country and their deportation. Bhurji returned home but his father soon decided to flee the country in 1973, rebuilding his company in Nairobi, Kenya. The family eventually settled in London where Bhurji began playing for Blackheath Hockey Club. With Blackheath, he won the National Indoor Championships in 1976.

Later life
Bhurji remained heavily involved with hockey, coaching in London for more than two decades and being employed as a professional photographer at hockey matches. He eventually retired from playing in 1991 after spending two weeks in a coma due to a blockage in his portal vein. In 1996, Bhurji suffered a gunshot wound to the leg after he was robbed along with a group of friends while coaching hockey in Nairobi. He is also a qualified civil engineer.

References

External links
 

1944 births
Living people
People from Jalandhar district
Indian emigrants to Uganda
Ugandan people of Indian descent
Ugandan people of Punjabi descent
Ugandan male field hockey players
Olympic field hockey players of Uganda
Field hockey players at the 1972 Summer Olympics